Edward Abington  may refer to:

Edward Habington (died 1586), also spelt Edward Abington, English conspirator in the Babington Plot
Edward Abington Jr., American diplomat

See also
Abington (disambiguation)